The following is a list of episodes of the Disney Channel original series, Violetta. As seen in the episode titles, almost all of them end with "una canción", meaning "a song" in Spanish. On Thursday and Friday January 22 and 23 on Disney Channel Latin America premieres a special with R5. These two episodes were filmed in October 2014 because Ross Lynch and his brothers were in a tour for Argentina. 

The series was released on May 14, 2012, and ended on February 6, 2015. During the course of the series, 240 episodes of Violetta aired over three seasons.

Series overview

Season 1 (2012)

Season 2 (2013)

Season 3 (2014–15) 
According to an interview with Diego Ramos, the series has been renewed for a third season which began filming in April 2014.

References 

Lists of children's television series episodes
Lists of Disney Channel television series episodes
Lists of Argentine television series episodes